Akka is a town in Tata Province, Souss-Massa, Morocco. According to the 2004 census it had a population of 7,102. It contains old buildings such as the Mohaddin (locally known as Lalla Baitollah) building in Kasabat-sidi Abdellah Ben M'Bark.

Akka may be the same as Vakka where, according to some traditions, the first Jews who migrated to Morocco settled.

References

Historic Jewish communities in North Africa
Jews and Judaism in Morocco
Populated places in Tata Province